Soul Box is the third studio album by American saxophonist Grover Washington Jr. The project was originally divided in two LPs, both released in 1973 on Kudu Records with quite identical covers as Soul Box Vol. 1 (KU-12) and Soul Box Vol. 2 (KU-13), then issued as a 2-LP set as KUX-1213. Both albums were recorded during March 1973 with the same personnel. With the rising of CD's Soul Box Vol. 1 & Soul Box Vol. 2 were reissued on CD by Motown in the early 1990's. Unfortunately Vol. 2 was mastered incorrectly with a totally wrong track separation. Original tracks #1 + #2 were combined into 1 single track of 17 minutes, track #3 was cut as track #2 and track #4 was cut as track #3. Subsequently a totally wrong printing on the CD and the back cover of the CD was performed: The CD contained & listed only 3 tracks. The printed titles were not matching the corresponding tracks and were stated with wrong durations, not matching the original songs of the LP. It took until 2008, when the two volumes were released on one CD by Verve/GRP Records to get the tracks right again with their track separations and title durations back to the original recordings from the Kudu LP's.

Track listing

Soul Box Vol. 1
"Aubrey" (David Gates) – 3:44
"Masterpiece" (Norman Whitfield) – 13:20
"Trouble Man" (Marvin Gaye) – 15:56

Soul Box Vol. 2
"You Are the Sunshine of My Life" (Stevie Wonder) – 6:03
"Don't Explain" (Arthur Herzog Jr., Billie Holiday) – 11:11
"Medley: Easy Living/Ain't Nobody's Business If I Do" (Leo Robin, Ralph Rainger)/(Everett Robbins, Porter Grainger) – 9:56
"Taurian Matador" (Billy Cobham Jr.) – 8:08

Motown 2*CD reissue

Soul Box Vol. 1
"Aubrey" (David Gates) – 3:44
"Masterpiece" (Norman Whitfield) – 13:22
"Trouble Man" (Marvin Gaye) – 15:54

Soul Box Vol. 2 (with incorrect track mastering & listing)
"You Are the Sunshine of My Life" (Stevie Wonder) – 17:23
"Don't Explain" (Arthur Herzog Jr., Billie Holiday) – 9:59
"Medley: Easy Living/'Taint Nobody's Business If I Do/Taurian Matador" (Leo Robin, Ralph Rainger)/(Everett Robbins, Porter Grainger/Billy Cobham Jr.) – 12:10

Verve 1*CD reissue
"Aubrey" (David Gates) – 3:44
"Masterpiece" (Norman Whitfield) – 13:20
"Trouble Man" (Marvin Gaye) – 15:56
"You Are the Sunshine of My Life" (Wonder) – 6:03
"Don't Explain" (Herzog Jr., Holiday) – 11:11
"Medley: Easy Living/Ain't Nobody's Business If I Do" (Robin, Rainger)/(Everett Robbins, Grainger) – 9:56
"Taurian Matador" (Billy Cobham Jr.) – 8:08

Personnel 

Band
 Grover Washington Jr. – alto saxophone, soprano saxophone, tenor saxophone 
 Bob James – acoustic piano, electric piano, arrangements and conductor
 Richard Tee – organ
 Jay Berliner – guitars (1)
 Eric Gale – guitars (2-7)
 Ron Carter – electric bass, arco bass
 Richard Davis – arco bass
 Idris Muhammad – drums (1-6)
 Billy Cobham – drums (7)
 David Friedman – percussion
 Phil Kraus – percussion
 Ralph MacDonald – percussion
 Airto Moreira – percussion

Brass Section
 Paul Faulise, Alan Raph and Tony Studd – bass trombone 
 Jim Buffington, Peter Gordon and  Brooks Tillotson – French horn
 Wayne Andre and Sonny Russo – trombone
 Randy Brecker, Jon Faddis, John Frosk and Bernie Glow – trumpet, flugelhorn

Woodwind Section
 Wally Kane – bass saxophone, contrabass clarinet, clarinet, flute
 Harvey Estrin – flute, piccolo flute
 Hubert Laws – flute, piccolo flute
 George Marge –  flute, oboe, piccolo flute
 Donald MacCourt – bassoon
 Romeo Penque – bass clarinet, clarinet, English horn, flute, oboe, piccolo flute

Strings
 Seymour Barab, Charles McCracken and George Ricci – cello 
 Ron Carter – double bass 
 Alfred Brown, Theodore Israel and Emanuel Vardi – viola
 Harry Cykman, Max Ellen, Paul Gershman, Emanuel Green, Harold Kohon, Charles Libove,  Harry Lookofsky, Joe Malin, Gene Orloff, David Nadien and Elliot Rosoff – violin

Vocals
 William Eaton, Eileen Gilbert, Barbara Massey, Randolph Peyton, Maeretha Stewart and Bernard Thacker

Production 
 Creed Taylor – producer 
 Rudy Van Gelder – engineer 
 Kevin Reeves – CD mastering at Sterling Sound (New York, NY).
 Kyle Benson – A&R coordinator 
 Andy Kman – production coordinator 
 Hollis King – art direction
 Bob Ciano – album design 
 Isabelle Wong – design 
 David A. Leffel – album painting 
 Harry Weinger – reissue supervisor

References

Kudu Records albums
Grover Washington Jr. albums
1973 albums
Albums produced by Creed Taylor